Zetin may refer to:
 Zetin-e Olya
 Zetin-e Sofla